Kati Lázár (born 14 December 1948) is a Hungarian actress. She appeared in more than eighty films since 1972.

Selected filmography

References

External links 

1948 births
Living people
People from Oradea
Hungarian film actresses